Fischer Nunatak is a nunatak,  high, standing  south of Mount Henderson in the northeast part of the Framnes Mountains, Mac. Robertson Land, Antarctica. It was mapped by Norwegian cartographers from air photos taken by the Lars Christensen Expedition, 1936–37, and named "Sornuten" (the south peak). It was renamed by the Australian National Antarctic Research Expeditions for H.J.L. Fischer, a cook at Mawson Station in 1958.

References 

Nunataks of Mac. Robertson Land